RPT can refer to:

Political parties 
 Rally of the Togolese People, Togo, 1969–2012
 Republican Party of Texas, United States

Science and technology 
 Rapid phase transition, in liquefied petroleum gas
 , the Repeat instruction in some computer architectures
 Registered Physical Therapist

Other uses 
 Rapting language, on New Guinea (by ISO 639 code)
 Registered Piano Technician, Piano Technicians Guild certification